María de los Angeles Fromow Rangel is a Mexican lawyer who served as Special Attorney for the Attention of Electoral Crimes of the Attorney General's Office. She was appointed Special Attorney in February 2001 by President Vicente Fox.

Fromow holds a bachelor's degree in law from the National Autonomous University of Mexico (UNAM), and has pursued graduate studies in different universities including the Universidad Complutense de Madrid.

In January 2007, President Felipe Calderón Hinojosa appointed her as head of the Liaisons Unit of the Health Secretariat.

In January 2013, President Enrique Peña Nieto appointed her as Technical Secretary of the Penal System.

References

21st-century Mexican lawyers
National Autonomous University of Mexico alumni
Federal political office-holders in Mexico
Place of birth missing (living people)
Year of birth missing (living people)
Living people
Mexican women in politics
Complutense University of Madrid alumni
Mexican women lawyers